Atremaea is a genus of moths in the family Gelechiidae.

Species
Atremaea lonchoptera Staudinger, 1871

References

Anomologini
Moth genera